The 1997 BAF British Championships was the national championship in outdoor track and field for the United Kingdom held at Alexander Stadium, Birmingham. The 10,000 metres event was hosted separately at the Sheffield Hallam UCA Stadium.

Organised by the British Athletics Federation (BAF), the competition was limited to British athletes only and marked a replacement to the UK Athletics Championships, which had last been held in 1993. The BAF British Championships overshadowed that year's AAA Championships, which was open to foreign competitors and typically the most prominent meet on the domestic calendar. This has led some statisticians, such as the National Union of Track Statisticians (NUTS), to judge the British Championships event as the main national championships for the country for 1997. Many of the athletes below also competed at the 1997 AAA Championships.

The bankruptcy of the British Athletics Federation that same year effectively rendered the competition defunct. The British Athletics Championships returned ten years later in 2007, organised by UK Athletics – the government-led successor organisation to the British Athletics Federation.

The main international track and field competition for the United Kingdom that year was the 1997 World Championships in Athletics. British javelin champion Steve Backley claimed world silver in Athens. UK runners-up Colin Jackson and Denise Lewis were also both runners-up at the global level.

Medal summary

Men

Women

References

UK Athletics Championships
UK Outdoor Championships
Athletics Outdoor
Sports competitions in Birmingham, West Midlands
Sports competitions in Sheffield
Athletics competitions in England